91 Aquarii b, also known as HD 219449 b, is an extrasolar planet orbiting in the 91 Aquarii system approximately 148 light-years away in the constellation of Aquarius.  It orbits at the average distance of 105 Gm from its star, which is slightly closer than Venus is to the sun (108 Gm).  The planet takes half an Earth year to orbit around the star in a very circular orbit with eccentricity less than 0.053.

See also

HD 59686 b
Iota Draconis b

References

 

Aquarius (constellation)
Giant planets
Exoplanets discovered in 2003
Exoplanets detected by radial velocity